Artspace may refer to:

 Artspace (website), an online marketplace based in New York City
 Artspace, New Haven, an art gallery in downtown New Haven, Connecticut
 Artspace Mackay, Mackay, Queensland, Australia
 Artspace NZ, a visual arts center in Auckland, New Zealand
 Artspace Projects, an NFP group that creates spaces for artists, based in Minneapolis, Minnesota
Artspace Read's, one of its live/work spaces for artists, in Bridgeport, Connecticut
 Artspace Visual Arts Centre, Sydney, Australia, known simply as Artspace
 Spike Island Artspace, formerly Artspace Bristol, UK

See also
 Arts centre